Roderick Townsend-Roberts (born July 1, 1992) is an American Paralympic athlete. In Tokyo 2021, he set a high jump world record (2.15 m) and won gold in high jump, silver in long jump. He won the long jump and high jump events at the 2016 Rio Paralympics and 2015 Parapan American Games. In 2015 he set two world records (2.07 and 2.12 m) and won the world title in the high jump in his disability class.  Townsend-Roberts cleared  at the 2019 Mt. SAC Relays to take his world record over 7 feet.

Roderick Townsend-Roberts sustained permanent nerve damage to his right arm and shoulder at birth. His parents are Jason and Mary Holloway. He has four younger siblings, Edell Storey, Jason Holloway, Amaury Holloway, and Farrah Washington. He played American football for two years at the Lincoln High School (Stockton, California) and served as the team captain in 2009. He has a degree in communications from Boise State University and used to work as an athletics coach at Northern Arizona University. He currently lives in Kentucky at the moment with his wife Tynita Butts.

References

External links

 
 
 

1992 births
Living people
Sportspeople from Stockton, California
American male sprinters
American male long jumpers
American male high jumpers
Paralympic track and field athletes of the United States
Athletes (track and field) at the 2016 Summer Paralympics
Athletes (track and field) at the 2020 Summer Paralympics
Medalists at the 2016 Summer Paralympics
Medalists at the 2020 Summer Paralympics
Paralympic gold medalists for the United States
World Para Athletics Championships winners
Paralympic medalists in athletics (track and field)
Track and field athletes from California
Boise State Broncos men's track and field athletes
Northern Arizona Lumberjacks coaches